Tamara Sonn is an American academic who specializes in Islamic and religious studies. She is currently the Hamad Bin Khalifa Al-Thani Professor in the History of Islam at Georgetown University. She was previously Kenan Professor of Religion and Humanities at the College of William & Mary.

Sonn received a B.A. in philosophy from Santa Clara University, an M.A. in philosophy from the University of Toronto, and a Ph.D. in Near Eastern languages and civilizations from the University of Chicago, where she studied under Fazlur Rahman.

Sonn is the author of the book A Brief History of Islam, written in 2004. In the book, she argues against violence and inequality for women under Islamic law; and commends Morocco's Mudawana family code for the abolishment of the patriarchal family and diction respecting women.

The United States Institute of Peace and the American Council of Learned Societies have funded her work through grants. She is on the board of directors of the American Council for the Study of Islamic Societies, previously as Vice President of the Eastern Division of the American Academy of Religion, and associate editor of the Middle East Studies Association Bulletin, Muslim World and the American Journal for Islamic Social Science.

Bibliography 
 Between Qur'an and Crown: The Challenge of Political Legitimacy in the Arab World (1990)
 Interpreting Islam: Bandali Jawzi's Islamic Intellectual History(1996)
 Islam and the Question of Minorities (1996)
 Comparing Religions through Law: Judaism and Islam with J. Neusner (1999)
 Judaism and Islam in Practice with J. Neusner and J. Brockopp (2000)
 A Brief History of Islam (2004, 2nd edition 2010).
 Is Islam an Enemy of the West? (2016)

References

College of William & Mary faculty
Living people
Year of birth missing (living people)
Santa Clara University alumni
University of Chicago alumni